Don Pardee Moon (April 18, 1894 – August 5, 1944) was a rear admiral of the United States Navy, who fought in the invasion of Europe.  He was born in Kokomo, Indiana, United States.  He married and had four children.

Biography
Moon entered the United States Naval Academy and later graduated fourth in the Class of 1916, being particularly efficient in gunnery.

He was assigned to the battleship  and while there developed several instruments to improve gunnery.  He later served in the battleships  and  before returning to shore duty in 1926.

By 1934 he was commanding officer of the Asiatic Fleet destroyer .

He was later put in command of a destroyer division in 1940 and became a captain in 1941.  He took part in the invasion of North Africa in 1942.

In 1944 he was promoted to rear admiral.  He commanded Exercise Tiger, a rehearsal for D-Day in which three LSTs were torpedoed and sunk by German E-boats near Slapton Sands.

During the June 6, 1944, invasion of Normandy he directed the landings on Utah Beach from the attack transport .  For three weeks the Bayfield was in position off Utah beach and officers and men were on four hour rotating shifts for this entire time.  Shortly afterwards the Bayfield was sent to Naples for the invasion of Southern France.  However, on August 5, 1944, Moon shot himself with his .45 caliber pistol.  His suicide was blamed on battle fatigue. He was posthumously decorated with Legion of Honour by the Government of France.

He was buried in Arlington National Cemetery.

He was survived by his wife Sibyl, and his four children, Meredith, Don, David, and Peter.

Memorials
Moon was depicted on a 2004 postage stamp issued to mark the 60th anniversary of D-Day by Sierra Leone.

See also

List of U.S. general officers and flag officers killed in World War II

References

 D-Day 1944 – Voices from Normandy, Robert Neillands and Roderick de Normann, Cold Spring Press, New York, 2004 
 My Dear Moon, Jonathan P. Alter, BookSurge Publishing,  2005

External links
 Department of the Navy – Rear Admiral Don Pardee Moon
 

1894 births
1944 deaths
People from Kokomo, Indiana
Military personnel from Indiana
United States Navy admirals
United States Naval Academy alumni
Naval War College alumni
United States Navy personnel of World War I
United States Navy World War II admirals
American military personnel who committed suicide
Suicides by firearm in Italy
Burials at Arlington National Cemetery
Recipients of the Distinguished Service Medal (US Army)
Recipients of the Legion of Merit
United States Navy personnel killed in World War II